Ochse can refer to the Ochsen, a mountain in Switzerland

Ochse is a German language surname. It stem from the German word Ochse for "ox" and was probably used as a nickname for a strong or lumbering individual. Notable people with the name include:
 Arthur Edward Ochse (1870–1918), South African cricketer
 Arthur Lennox Ochse (1899–1949), South African cricketer
 Chum Ochse (1925–1996), South African rugby union wing
 Fernand Ochsé (1879–1944), French Jewish designer, dandy, author, composer and painter
 Hildegard Ochse (1935–1997), German photographer
 Jacob Jonas Ochse (1892–1970), Dutch botanist
 Louise Ochsé (1884–1944), Franco-Belgian sculptor
 Weston Ochse (1965), American author and educator

See also 
 Ochs (surname)

References 

Dutch-language surnames
German-language surnames
Surnames from nicknames
Afrikaans-language surnames
Jewish surnames